Camabatela Airport   is a public use airport serving Camabatela, Cuanza Norte Province, Angola.

See also

 List of airports in Angola
 Transport in Angola

References

External links 
OurAirports - Camabatela
OpenStreetMap - Camabatela

Airports in Angola
Cuanza Norte Province